The False Alarm is a 1926 American silent drama film directed by Frank O'Connor and starring Ralph Lewis, Dorothy Revier and John Harron.

Cast
 Ralph Lewis as Fighting John Casey 
 Dorothy Revier as Mary Doyle 
 John Harron as Joe Casey 
 George O'Hara as Tim Casey 
 Priscilla Bonner as Bessie Flannigan 
 Mary Carr
 Lillian Leighton as Mrs. Flannigan
 Maurice Costello
 Billy Franey
 Arthur Hoyt

References

Bibliography
 Munden, Kenneth White. The American Film Institute Catalog of Motion Pictures Produced in the United States, Part 1. University of California Press, 1997.

External links

1926 films
1926 drama films
Silent American drama films
American silent feature films
1920s English-language films
Columbia Pictures films
Films directed by Frank O'Connor
American black-and-white films
1920s American films